John Caulfeild (c.1690 – 19 October 1764) was an Anglo-Irish politician.

Caulfeild was the Member of Parliament for Charlemont in the Irish House of Commons between 1723 and 1760.

References

Year of birth uncertain
1764 deaths
18th-century Anglo-Irish people
John
Irish MPs 1715–1727
Irish MPs 1727–1760
Members of the Parliament of Ireland (pre-1801) for County Armagh constituencies